"Never Let Her Go" is a song by David Gates, lead singer of the group Bread. It was released as a single in 1974 and is the title track from the 1975 album of the same name. It also appeared on Gates' third solo album, Goodbye Girl.

The song reached number 29 on the Billboard Hot 100 and peaked at number 3 on the Adult Contemporary chart in March 1975.

Chart performance

References

1974 songs
1974 singles
David Gates songs
Songs written by David Gates
Elektra Records singles